Alexander Valerievich Lebedev (born 24 July 2002) is a Russian-born figure skater who competes for Belarus. He is the 2020 Belarusian national silver medalist, the 2019 Skate Victoria silver medalist, and the 2019 Jégvirág Cup bronze medalist. Lebedev has competed in the final segment at two ISU Championships – the 2020 European Championships and the 2020 World Junior Championships.

Programs

Competitive highlights 
GP: Grand Prix; CS: Challenger Series; JGP: Junior Grand Prix

For Belarus

For Russia

Detailed results 
ISU Personal best highlighted in bold.
 For Belarus

Senior results

Junior results

References

External links 
 
 Alexander Lebedev at the Skating Union of Belarus
 

2002 births
Living people
Russian male single skaters
Belarusian male single skaters
People from Seversk
Russian emigrants to Belarus
Sportspeople from Tomsk Oblast